Jan Adriaan Booysen (born 17 May 1996) is a Namibian rugby union player for the Dallas Jackals in Major League Rugby (MLR), having previously played for the Houston SaberCats.

His regular position is number eight.

Rugby career

Booysen was born in Gobabis.

References

External links
 

Namibian rugby union players
Living people
1996 births
People from Gobabis
Rugby union number eights
Houston SaberCats players
Namibia international rugby union players
Welwitschias players
Dallas Jackals players
White Namibian people